Branch Warren is an American retired IFBB professional bodybuilder.

Early life
Warren was born in Tyler, Texas. He grew up on a cattle ranch and later moved to Fort Worth, Texas.

Career
Warren placed second at the 2009 Mr. Olympia, the closest he came to winning the competition. His best wins came when he won both the 2011 and 2012 Arnold Classic competitions. He was previously sponsored by MuscleTech and Gaspari Nutrition. He often trains with Johnnie Jackson at the Metroflex Gym in Arlington, Texas, having also trained with Janae Kroc. He retired in 2015, and is now the founder and owner of a beef jerky company called Wicked Cutz Jerky.

Personal life
Warren is married to a fellow bodybuilder named Trish. Their daughter, Faith Lea, was born on February 6, 2012.

Bodybuilding competitions
1992 AAU Teenage Mr. America, Short and Overall - 1st
1993 NPC Teenage Nationals, Lightheavyweight and Overall - 1st
2001 NPC Nationals, Heavyweight - 1st
2005 Charlotte Pro - 1st
2005 Europa Supershow - 1st
2005 Mr. Olympia - 8th
2006 Mr. Olympia - 12th
2007 New York Pro - 1st
2009 Mr. Olympia - 2nd
2010 Mr. Olympia - 3rd
2011 Arnold Classic - 1st
2011 British Grand Prx - 1st
2012 Arnold Classic - 1st
2012 Australian Grand Prix - 1st
2012 Mr. Olympia - 5th
2013 Mr. Olympia - 9th
2014 Dallas Europa - 1st
2014 Australian Pro - 4th
2014 Mr. Olympia - 6th
2015 Arnold Classic - 2nd
2015 Arnold classic Australia - 2nd 
2015 Europa Atlantic City Pro - 1st
2015 Mr. Olympia - 6th

See also
List of male professional bodybuilders

References

External links
Official website
Branch Warren video online
Wicked Cutz Jerky

1975 births
Living people
Professional bodybuilders